The Northern Premier League is an English football league that was founded in 1968. It has four divisions: the Premier Division (which stands at level 7 of the English football league system), Division One East, Division One West and Division One Midlands (which stand at level 8).

Geographically, the league covers all of Northern England and the northern, central areas of the Midlands, and western parts of East Anglia. Originally a single-division competition, a second division was added in 1987: Division One, and in 2007 a third was added when Division One split into two geographic sections - Division One North and Division One South. In 2018 Division One was re-aligned as East and West Divisions, then North West and South East in 2019.  In 2021, the FA restructured the non-League football pyramid and created Division One East, West, and Midlands.

Successful teams at the top of the NPL Premier Division are promoted to level 6 of the pyramid (either National League North or National League South), and at the bottom end of the competition, teams are relegated down to level 9, where several regional feeder leagues promote clubs into the league.

History
The Northern Premier League (NPL) was founded in 1968, as the northern equivalent of the Southern League, decades after the other two leagues at what is now the seventh tier of the English football league system, the Isthmian League and the Southern League. At that time they were the highest level non-League division below the English Football League, the same level as the other league in Northern England, the Northern League.

Over the next two decades, the NPL successfully displaced its older rival to become the pre-eminent regional competition in Northern England, with the Northern League eventually forced to accept status as feeder league to the NPL. In 1979, upon the creation of the Alliance Premier League (which later became the Conference and is now the National League), the NPL became a feeder league and fell down one level in the English football league system, and with the then-Conference's addition of regional divisions in 2004 the NPL was demoted by a further tier and there are now two levels between it and the English Football League.

From 1992–93 to 1994–95 the league's Division One included two non-English clubs, Caernarfon Town from Wales and Gretna from Scotland, who later joined their countries' league systems. Colwyn Bay, Bangor City, Newtown, and Rhyl have also played in the league.

In 2018, the NPL's member clubs voted 37–27, with one abstention and three clubs' absence, to split Step 4 (level 8) divisions from east to west starting from the 2018–19 season, and one year later, the league published its successful bid to add another division at Step 4 initially in 2020, further altering Division One into northwest and southeast for travel reasons. After the Football Association (FA) deferred its implementation of changes to the NLS, the NPL's additional division was created in 2021 instead.

1968–69 to 1986–87: Premier Division
1987–88 to 2006–07: Premier Division, Division One
2007–08 to 2017–18: Premier Division, Division One North, Division One South
2018–19: Premier Division, Division One East, Division One West
2019–20 to 2020–21: Premier Division, Division One North West, Division One South East
2021–22 onwards: Premier Division, Division One West, Division One East, Division One Midlands

Sponsorship
Owing to title sponsorship deals, the league has been billed under various names, including a sixteen-year spell as the Unibond League, the longest such deal in world football. 
When this deal ended in 2010, a new deal was announced which saw the competition billed as the Evo-Stik League until the 2017–18 season.
The League announced on 8 July 2019 that a two-year deal for seasons 2019-20 and 2020-21 had been agreed with new sponsor BetVictor. This sponsorship agreement with BetVictor was subsequently terminated early in April 2020 with a replacement, Entain's Pitching In, announced as the next sponsor for 2020–21. At the time of announcement, Entain went by its former name GVC Holdings. Under this partnership, the NPL is marketed as one of the three Trident Leagues, alongside its Isthmian and Southern counterparts.

Structure
Since 2021, the NPL has had four divisions: the Premier Division, Division One Midlands, Division One West and Division One East. Prior to 2007 there was just a single Division One, and from 2018 to 2021 Division One was arranged on a north-south, then east-west basis. 

The Premier Division has 22 clubs, with the champions promoted to the National League along with the winners of a playoff between the second to fifth place clubs. Theoretically, clubs from the NPL could be promoted into either of the National League's two regional divisions, but the geographical footprint of the NPL has never overlapped with that of the National League South, so (as of 2015) all promoted NPL clubs have been placed in the National League North. The bottom three teams are usually relegated to Division One North West or South East, but NPL Premier Division clubs in the most southerly locales could be relegated to the Southern League Division One Central.

From the 2019–20 season, Division One North West and South East have 20 clubs each. In each division, the champions are promoted to the Premier Division, along with the winners of a divisional playoff. The bottom two clubs in each division are relegated to one of the feeder leagues below provided there are enough suitable promotion candidates from those leagues. The champions of the three feeder leagues covering the NPL area are promoted each season. These are the Northern League, the Northern Counties East League, and the North West Counties League. Clubs in the northern extremities of the Midland League and the United Counties League may also be promoted to the Northern Premier League.

Should there be an unusually large or small number of clubs relegated to and/or promoted to the level of the NPL from Northern England, the National League System (NLS) Committee can order one or more of the NPL's southernmost clubs to transfer to the Southern League (or vice versa) to maintain numerical balance between the leagues.

Division One North West and South East teams receive a bye to the preliminary round of FA Cup Qualification. Premier Division teams receive a bye to the first round of Qualification.

The league currently runs one cup competition, with all member clubs competing in the League Challenge Cup.  In the past, the league has run other competitions, such as the Chairman's Cup, the President's Cup and the Peter Swales Shield.

Current members

Premier Division

Division One West

Division One East

Division One Midlands

Champions

Promoted
Since the league's formation in 1968, the following clubs have won promotion to higher levels of the English football league system -

Asterisk indicates club was promoted via play-offs

Cup competitions

League Challenge Cup
The league currently runs one cup competition, the League Challenge Cup, which is contested by every club in the league.

Finals

Defunct competitions
In the past the league has run three other cup competitions - the President's Cup, Chairman's Cup and Peter Swales Shield.

Winners

See also
Isthmian League
Southern Football League

References

External links
 

 
1968 establishments in England
7
Sports leagues established in 1968
Eng